Simon Kemboi (born March 1, 1967) is a retired sprinter from Kenya. He specialised in 400 metres. He is a World Championships and African Championships medalist, and competed at the Olympics.

Career
Kemboi was part of the 4x400 relay team that finished fifth at the 1991 World Championships. He competed at the Olympics for first time at the 1992 Summer Olympics, taking part in 400 metres, where he reached semifinal. He was also part of the Kenyan 4x400 relay team that advanced to the final, but did not finish it. At the 1992 IAAF World Cup, he was part of the African 4 × 400 m team that won gold.

At the 1993 World Championships, he won silver part of the Kenyan 4 × 400 m relay team. Other members of the team were Samson Kitur, Kennedy Ochieng and Abednego Matilu. In the 400 metres individual race he was 7th. He won bronze over 400 metres at the 1993 African Championships in a race won by compatriot Kennedy Ochieng, and may have been part of the Kenyan 4 × 400 m team that won gold.

The second of his two Olympics assignment was at the 1996 Summer Olympics, when he competed only at the 4x400 metres relay race, where Kenya reached the final again, but did not start it. He won silver over 400 metres at the 1996 African Championships in Athletics. The Kenyan 4 × 400 m team won also silver.

Doping
He was selected to compete at the 2000 Summer Olympics, but was suspended after testing positive for nandrolone in September 2000.

References

External links

Sports-reference.com - Simon Kemboi

1967 births
Kenyan male sprinters
Athletes (track and field) at the 1992 Summer Olympics
Athletes (track and field) at the 1996 Summer Olympics
Olympic athletes of Kenya
Doping cases in athletics
Kenyan sportspeople in doping cases
Living people
World Athletics Championships medalists